Karunakar Vaidya (1914-1989) was a Nepalese writer and folklorist. He is one of the few writers to win the Madan Puraskar, the most prestigious literary award in Nepali literature, twice. He won the award for Mitrika Udhyog in 1956 and for Nepalko Paramparagat Parbidhi in 1979.

Biography 
He was born in 1914 (1971 BS Shrawan) in Swath Narayansthan, Lalitpur. 

He received the prestigious Madan Puraskar for his books Mitrika Udhyog in 2014 BS and Nepalko Paramparagat Parbidhi in 2036 BS. 

He died in 2046 BS.

Notable works 

 Mitrika Udhyog (1956)
 Nepalko Paramparagat Parbidhi (1979)
 Nepalko Lok Katha Sangraha (Nepalese Folktales Collection)
 Nepali Dantya Katha Sangraha (Nepalese Oral Tales Collection)
 Bishwa Lok Katha Sangraha (World Folktales Collection)
 Aanchalik Nepali Lok Katha (Nepalese Regional Folktales)

See also 

 Nityaraj Pandey
 Leeladhwaj Thapa
 Satya Mohan Joshi

References 

1914 births
20th-century deaths
Year of death uncertain
Madan Puraskar winners
People from Lalitpur District, Nepal
Nepali-language writers
Nepalese writers
Nepalese folklorists
20th-century male writers
20th-century Nepalese male writers
20th-century Nepalese writers
Nepali-language writers from Nepal

1989 deaths